The Lady in Red (also known as Guns, Sin and Bathtub Gin) is a 1979 American crime drama film directed by Lewis Teague and starring Pamela Sue Martin and Robert Conrad. It is an early writing effort of John Sayles who became better known as a director in the 1980s and 1990s.

Premise
The film tells a 1930s' crime story of a poor farmer's daughter who leaves for Chicago, where she is sent to prison, works as a prostitute, falls in love with notorious criminal John Dillinger, witnesses his death, and finally tries bank robbery.

Cast 

 Pamela Sue Martin as Polly Franklin
 Robert Conrad as John Dillinger
 Louise Fletcher as Anna Sage
 Robert Hogan as Jake Lingle
 Laurie Heineman as Rose Shimkus
 Glenn Withrow as Eddie
 Rod Gist as Pinetop
 Peter Hobbs as Pops Geissler
 Christopher Lloyd as Frognose
 Dick Miller as Patek
 Nancy Parsons as Tiny Alice
 Alan Vint as Melvin Purvis
 Robert Forster as Turk (uncredited)

Production
The soundtrack of this film is notable as the first film score composed by James Horner, who went on to a multiple Oscar, Golden Globe and Grammy-winning career.

Teague recalls, "I was given that script and told to go with it. I didn't really have a chance to mold or change it. It was very socially conscious for an action picture about the Great Depression. I had 20 days to shoot it, and three to edit and a budget of less than a million."

John Sayles later said the film "didn't turn out the way I wanted because they just didn't have the budget to make the movie right. I wanted that to be a real breathless, '30s, Jimmy Cagney everybody-talking-fast type movie. It turned out a little more like Louis Malle. Different movies have different speeds."

Release
The film was not a big success at the box office. Roger Corman re-released it in 1980 under the title Guns, Sin and Bathtub Gin, but it did not fare much better.

On December 17, 2010, Shout! Factory released the title on DVD, packaged as a double feature with Crazy Mama as part of the Roger Corman Cult Classics collection.

Reception 
Quentin Tarantino called it "my candidate for most ambitious film ever made at Roger Corman’s New World Pictures... Not only do I think this thirties era epic... is Sayles best screenplay, I also think it’s the best script ever written for an exploitation movie." On Rotten Tomatoes, the film has an aggregated score of 83% based on 5 positive and 1 negative reviews.

In popular culture 
In Quentin Tarantino's novel Once Upon a Time in Hollywood, in an alternate history, he himself had released a remake of the film in 1999.

References

External links 
 

1979 films
1979 crime drama films
Films about John Dillinger
Films directed by Lewis Teague
Films scored by James Horner
American crime drama films
Films produced by Julie Corman
Films with screenplays by John Sayles
1979 drama films
1970s English-language films
1970s American films